John Abernethy may refer to:
John Abernethy (bishop), Scottish bishop, died 1639
John Abernethy (judge) (born 1947), Australian judge
John Abernethy (minister) (1680–1740), Presbyterian minister in Ireland
John Abernethy (surgeon) (1764–1831), English surgeon and grandson of the above, and originator of the Abernethy biscuit
Jack Abernathy (1876–1941), United States Marshall

See also
Abernethy (surname)